Paragorgopis clathrata is a species of ulidiid or picture-winged fly in the genus Paragorgopis of the family Ulidiidae.

References

clathrata
Insects described in 1909